Bulgarian nouns have the categories: grammatical gender, number, case (only vocative) and definiteness. A noun has one of three specific grammatical genders (masculine, feminine, neuter) and two numbers (singular and plural), with cardinal numbers and some adverbs, masculine nouns use a separate count form. Definiteness is expressed by a definite article which is postfixed to the noun.

Noun formation
Nouns can be formed from other words by means of suffixes. Some important suffixes that are used to form nouns are:
-ар for male people (рибар – fisher, книжар – bookseller, бръснар – barber);
-ач for male people (носач – carrier, купувач – buyer, продавач – seller);
-тел for male people (учител – teacher, родител – parent, строител – builder);
-ин for male people (българин – a Bulgarian, гражданин – citizen, селянин – villager);
-ик for male people (виновник – culprit, изменик – betrayer, довереник – agent);
-ец for male people (летец – flier, хубавец – handsome man, планинец – mountaineer);
-ица for female people (царица – queen, певица – singer, хубавица – belle);
 for female animals (лъвица – lioness, слоница – female elephant, магарица – jennet);
 for feminine diminutives (водица – water, главица – head, сестрица – sister);
 for feminine objects (ножица – scissors, вилица – fork, солница – saltern);
 for products for eating and drinking (лютеница – pepper puree, наденица – sausage, сливовица – plum-brandy);
-ка for female people (учителка – female teacher, лекарка – female doctor, студентка – female university student);
 for feminine diminutives (градинка – garden, картинка – picture, калинка – ladybird);
-ник for objects (хладилник – refrigerator, чайник – teapot, калник – mud-guard);
 for places with certain purpose (рибарник – breeding-pond, рудник – colliery);
-иня for female people (богиня – goddess, боркиня – woman fighter, немкиня – a German woman/girl);
-алня for places with certain purpose (читалня – reading-room, съблекалня – changing-room);
-ище for places where something is done (училище – school, читалище – library club, игрище – playground);
 for augmentatives (мъжище, женище, детище);
-ница for places where something is done (бръснарница – barber's, млекарница – milk shop);
-ство for places where a department is located (издателство – publishing house, посолство – embassy);
 for the names of certain activities (тъкачество – weaving, шивачество – needlecraft);
 for the names of certain qualities (удобство – convenience, нехайство – carelessness);
 for collective nouns (войнство – army, студентство – students);
-а for the names of some actions (просвета – education, проява – act/deed);
-ба for the names of some actions (борба — fight, молба — request);
-ние for the names of some action (учение — teaching, писание — writing);
-ина for the names of abstract qualities (топлина – warmth, бързина – quickness);
-еж for the names of some actions (строеж – building, стремеж – striving);
-итба for the names of some actions (сеитба – sowing, коситба – mowing);
-не for the names of some actions (четене – reading, писане – writing);
-ост for the names of abstract qualities (младост, твърдост – hardness);
-ие for abstract nouns (съгласие – agreement, усилие – effort);
-е for masculine diminutives (столе, пръсте – small finger);
-ота for the names of abstract qualities (топлота – warmth, красота – beauty);
-ле for masculine diminutives (носле – nose, вратле — neck);
-че for masculine diminutives (братче – brother, столче – small chair);
-ичка for feminine diminutives (водичка — water, главичка – small head);
-це for neuter diminutives (крилце – small wing, селце – small village);

Gender
In Bulgarian nouns have three genders: masculine, feminine and neuter. The gender is an inherent characteristic of every noun. This means that each noun is masculine, feminine or neuter. Only nouns referring to people or animals can change their gender. In most cases the gender of the noun can be determined according to its ending, but there aren't any strict rules. Masculines are all the nouns which refer to male people or animals, and many more.

Nouns referring to people or animals can change their gender (from masculine to feminine) by
adding the suffixes: -ка, -ица, -а, -иня:
 учител — учителка
 цар — царица
 лъв — лъвица
 дебелан — дебелана
 бог — богиня
The gender of nouns that have no singular form can't be determined: финанси, очила, обуща.

Some nouns have changed gender with time, for example the feminine vecher (evening — it retains its masculine character in the phrase dobur vecher – good evening), or var (lime). Some words, in spoken Bulgarian at least, can take either gender, e.g. domat/domata (tomato — masc/fem) or sandal/sandala (sandal); some can take either gender with slight variations in meaning, e.g. gaz (gas) or prah (dust); while others, usually for etymological reasons, can have completely different meanings – e.g. med means "honey" in the masculine, and "copper" in the feminine, or prust, meaning  finger (masc), or soil (fem).

Number
A noun has singular (единствено) and plural (множествено) number (число). Unlike in English, where almost all nouns add -s in the plural, in Bulgarian there are many endings and despite of the rules listed below one cannot be absolutely sure which ending to use with which noun. Besides, when forming the plural some nouns alter additionally. That is why a noun should always be learnt together with its plural form. Generally if the noun ends in a vowel, it is removed before adding the plural suffix. Sometimes the stress changes position.

{|class="wikitable"
!colspan="5"|Plural endings
|-
! Gender
! Ending
! Examples
! Additional alterations
! Examples
|-
!rowspan="20"| Masculine
!align="center", rowspan="7"| и
(most of the nouns having two or more syllables and a few monosyllabic nouns)
|rowspan="7"| наро̀д—наро̀ди
баща̀—бащѝ

съдия̀—съдѝи

геро̀й—геро̀и

зъб—зъ̀би

лъч—лъчѝ

го̀ст—го̀сти
| A change from the velar consonants к, г, х, which are exactly before the ending -и, to ц, з, с respectively This change does not occur with loanwords ending in -нг (-ng)
| езѝк—езѝци, по̀длог—по̀длози, кожу̀х—кожу̀с''и; loanwords: мѝтинг—мѝтинги (meeting), ло̀зунг—ло̀зунги (Losung)
|-
| Losing the sound е in the final part of the word
| чужденѐц—чужденцѝ
|-
| Losing the sound ъ in the final part of the word. This happens almost always and not only when adding и
| теа̀тър—теа̀три; exception: пода̀рък—пода̀ръци
|-
| Losing the sound е in the final part of the word and inserting ъ before л, or р
| беглѐц—бегълцѝ
|-
| Losing the suffix -ин
| бъ̀лгарин—бъ̀лгари
|-
| A change from е (when it is after a vowel) to й
| боѐц—бойцѝ
|-
| A combination of the above alterations, for example losing the sound ъ in the final part of the word and a change from к to ц
| мо̀мък—момци
|-
!align="center", rowspan="5"| ове
(most of the monosyllabic nouns and a few disyllabic nouns)
|rowspan="5"| град—градовè
стол—столòве

блок—блокòве

вятър—ветровè
| A change of the stress position
| грàд—градовè, стòл—столòве
|-
| A change from я to е (apophony)
| бряг—бреговè
|-
| Metathesis of ъ in the letter group ръ
| връх—върховè
|-
| Palatalization of the preceding consonant, indicated by the letter ь
| зет—зèтьове
|-
| A combination of the above alterations
| вятър—ветровè (a change from я to е, and losing ъ in the final part of the word), огън—огньòве (palatalization of the preceding consonant and losing ъ in the final part of the word)
|-
!align="center"| еве
(most monosyllabic nouns ending in й)
| брой – броевè
|align="center"| —
|align="center"| —
|-
!align="center"| е
(only a few nouns)
|мъж—мъжè
кòн—конè
| The stress always falls on the last syllable
| крàл—кралè, княз—князè, цàр—царè
|-
!align="center", rowspan="2"| а
(only a few nouns)
|rowspan=2|крàк—кракà
рòг—рогà
|The stress always falls on the last syllable
| лист—листà
|-
| Losing the suffix -ин
| господин—господà
|-
!align="center"| я
(only one noun)
| брат—брàтя
|align="center"| —
|align="center"| —
|-
!align="center"| ища
(only a few nouns)
|път—пътища
край—крàища

сън—сънища
|align="center"| —
|align="center"| —
|-
!align="center"| чета
(some diminutives formed with the suffix -ец)
| градче—градчета
|align="center"| —
|align="center"| —
|-
!align="center"| овци
(nouns referring to people)
| чичо—чичовци
дядо—дядовци

мързелан—мързелановци
|align="center"| —
|align="center"| —
|-
!rowspan="4"| Feminine
!align="center", rowspan="3"| и
(almost all nouns)
|rowspan="3"|жена—жени
цел—цели

стая—стаи

вест—вести

стойност—стойности
| A change from я to е (apophony)
| вяра—вери
|-
| Losing е and ъ in the final part of the word
| песен—песни, мисъл—мисли
|-
| Metathesis of ъ in the letter group ръ
| кръв—кърви
|-
!align="center"|е
(only the following nouns)
| овца—овце
свиня—свине
| A change from the velar consonants к and г to ц and з respectively
| ръка—ръце, нога—нозе
|-
!rowspan="8"| Neuter
!align="center", rowspan="2"| а
(nouns, ending in -о, -це, -щe)
|rowspan="2"|дърво—дърва
петънце—петънца

училище—училища
| A change of the stress position
| сèло—селà
|-
| A change from я to е (apophony)
|тя̀ло—телà
|-
!align="center"| та
(nouns ending in -ле, -е, -че, and loanwords ending in -у, -ю, -и)
| носле—нослета
море—морета

братче—братчета

бижу—бижута

меню—менюта

такси—таксита
|align="center"| —
|align="center"| —
|-
!align="center"| я
(nouns ending in -ие and a few more)
|изключение—изключения
допълнение—допълнения
| A change of the stress position
| цвèте—цветя̀, ло̀зе—лозя̀
|-
!align="center"| на
(only a few nouns ending in -ме)
| ѝме—имена̀
врѐме—времена̀
|The stress always falls on the last syllable
|зна̀ме—знамена̀, плѐме—племена̀
|-
!align="center", rowspan="2"|са
(very few nouns)
|rowspan="2"| чу̀до—чудеса̀
небѐ—небеса̀
| A change of the final о into е
| чу̀до—чудеса̀
|-
| The stress always falls on the last syllable
| небѐ—небеса̀
|-
!align="center"| и
(not a large amount of nouns, ending in -о)
| живо̀тно—живо̀тни
насеко̀мо—насеко̀ми
| A change from the velar consonants к and х to ч and ш respectively
| око̀—очѝ, ухо̀-ушѝ
|}

Count form

Masculine nouns which end in a consonant have another plural form, besides their usual one. This form is called count form or numerical form (бройна форма — broyna forma), and is used only after cardinal numbers and the adverbs колко (how many), толкова (this/that/so many), няколко (several/a few/some): пет / колко / толкова / няколко молива versus тези моливи. An exception to this occurs in some exclamations following колко, when the ordinary plural is used and the inferred meaning is "what a large amount of!": e.g. колко коня? (kolko konya? "how many horses?" – numeric plural), but колко коне! (kolko kone! – ordinary plural, implying "look at all those horses!").

The count form is formed with the endings -а and -я, and unlike the usual plural form without any additional changes (no losing of the sounds -ъ and -е, no change of consonants, etc.), except for stress moving (it never falls on the last syllable so if it is on the last syllable in the singular, it will move on the penultimate in the count form), and metathesis of ъ in the letter group ръ.

There are also a handful of neuter nouns for parts of the body which also take a count form – ramo (shoulder) → ramene / 2 ramena; kolyano (knee) → kolene / 2 kolena.

* Some nouns have different count forms according to their meaning.  When "литър" (litre) and "метър" (metre) mean measures of volume and length, their count form is "литра" and "метра" respectively. But when "метър" means "meter" (a device that measures and records the amount of electricity, gas, water, etc.) its count form is "метъра". The case is the same with "път": път ("road") – пътя and път ("time", "occasion", "instance") – пъти. The nouns "литър" and "метър" are the only ones that lose the "ъ" in their count forms.

** The usual plural form of the noun "ден" (day) is "дни" and its count form is "дена". "Дни" can be used instead of "дена", but not vice versa. The combinations of words два дни and два дена are both correct, but the sentence Зимните дена са студени (Winter days are cold) is incorrect. The usual form must be used, not the count one – Зимните дни са студени.The count form is avoided with nouns denoting persons and in such cases the usual plural form is much more preferred (колко ученици – how many students, осем ученици — eight students).

The usual form is also used after masculine numbers (in Bulgarian some cardinal numbers have gender), ending in -ма (these forms of the numbers are used only with male persons, not with other masculine nouns denoting inanimate objects) – двама ученици (two students), петима ученици (five students).

Irregular and variant forms
Some nouns have irregular plural forms:
 човек/čovek (person) — хора/hora (people) — души/duši (people — numerical form) 
 дете/dete (child) — деца/deca (children)

Some neuter nouns have two or more plural forms (most of them with no difference in meaning). For example: кълбо — кълба and кълбета, крило — крила and криле, рамо — рамена and рамене, коляно — колена and колене, море — морета and моря, дърво — дървета, дърва and дървеса, четене — четения and четенета. Some plural forms refer to different meanings: дърва – fuel wood, дървета – trees, some are used in specific contexts: the variants моря (from море), поля (from поле) are found only in the poetry.

In Bulgarian there are some nouns that are only in the singular, they are uncountable. Such nouns are some abstract words (материализъм – materialism, сигурност – security, любов — love), some collective words (студентство – students), chemical elements and some other substances (водород – hydrogen, въглерод – carbon, грис – semolina, ориз – rice, etc.). There are also words which have only plural forms. These are nouns referring to objects, composed of two identical parts (очила – glasses, ножици – scissors), and some concepts and objects, consisting of many elements (въглища – coal, финанси – finances, пари'' – money).

Definiteness
In Bulgarian nouns have the grammatical category definiteness (определеност). The morphological indicator of definiteness is the presence of a special morpheme, called definite article (определителен член). The definite article is placed after the noun and is written together with it. The using of the definite article in Bulgarian is called членуване.

*Nouns that end in a consonant and are masculine use –ът/–ят ("full article"-"пълен член"), when they are grammatical subjects, and –а/–я ("short article"-"кратък член"), when they are grammatical objects. This rule is observed only in writing. In speech, there is no distinction between the full and the short article, and the short form is normally used in all cases.

There is an additional discrepancy between pronunciation and spelling when the stress of some monosyllabic masculine nouns falls on the definite articles -а or -ят/я.

Case

In Bulgarian masculine and feminine nouns have two cases (падежи) Nominative (Именителен падеж) and Vocative (Звателен падеж). The vocative is used when addressing a person or a thing, in all other cases the nominative is used. Theoretically, all masculine and feminine nouns can be declined in the vocative but vocative forms are used mainly with personal names and with nouns denoting people.

*Most common nouns ending in -ка can be found both with the ending о and е (/, /). One of the forms is considered colloquial, but there aren't any strict rules which one. For example: the form другарко is found more often than другарке, but директорко (instead of директорке) sounds very odd. Generally, the form with о is ruder.

Feminine nouns which end in a consonant do not have vocative forms.

Usage of vocative
There is a difference in usage between vocative forms of common nouns and proper nouns. The former are used always, when addressing someone, and the use of nominative forms instead is immediately perceived as a gross error:

The latter, however, are considered informal, and are used less frequently, especially the
vocative forms of female personal names ending in -о, which are even considered by some to be rude or rustic (Елено, Богдано). Nevertheless, nominative forms (especially the male ones) sound too formal, even snobbish, and are used rarely by native speakers. Instead, diminutives (Еленче, Богданче) or short forms (Ели, Боби) are preferred. Diminutives are used usually by elder people, when addressing younger ones.

Male vocative forms and female ones ending in е are used regularly and their substitution with nominative forms is also considered a gross error (or the speaker may sound too snobbish).

There is difference between the vocative form of both male and female short name forms and their other, non-vocative form (the form that is used in all other cases). The latter takes the definite article -та or -то, depending on the ending:

See also
 Bulgarian grammar
 wikt:bg:Начална страница (Bulgarian wiktionary)

Notes

Bulgarian grammar
Declension